Alex Matthias Tamm (born 24 July 2001) is an Estonian professional footballer who currently plays as a forward for Meistriliiga club Nõmme Kalju and the Estonia national team.

International career
Tamm made his senior international debut for Estonia on 8 January 2023, in a 1–1 draw against Iceland in a friendly.

Honours
Nõmme Kalju U21
Esiliiga B: 2017

Nõmme Kalju
Meistriliiga: 2018
Estonian Supercup: 2019

Individual
Meistriliiga Under-21 Player of the Season: 2022

References

External links

2001 births
Living people
Footballers from Tallinn
Estonian footballers
Association football forwards
Nõmme Kalju FC players
Grasshopper Club Zürich players
Esiliiga B players
Esiliiga players
Meistriliiga players
Estonia youth international footballers
Estonia under-21 international footballers
Estonia international footballers
Estonian expatriate footballers
Expatriate footballers in Switzerland
Estonian expatriate sportspeople in Switzerland